Philadelphia Lawyer is a term to describe a lawyer who knows the most detailed and minute points of law or is an exceptionally competent lawyer. Its first known usage dates back to 1788. 

Philadelphia-based Colonial American lawyer Andrew Hamilton, a  lawyer best known for his legal victory on behalf of printer and newspaper publisher John Peter Zenger, is believed to have inspired the "Philadelphia lawyer" term. This 1735 decision helped to establish that truth is a defense to an accusation of libel.

See also
 Philadelphia (film), a legal drama

References

Informal legal terminology
Culture of Philadelphia